Vexilliferidae is a family of Amoebozoa, classified under Dactylopodida.

It has also been classified under Gymnamoebia.

It includes the genera Neoparamoeba, Pseudoparamoeba and Vexillifera.

References

Amoebozoa families
Discosea